Club Deportivo Margaritense is a Spanish football team based in Santa Margalida, Majorca, in the autonomous community of Balearic Islands. Founded in 1955, it holds home games at Estadio Antoni Quetglas, with a 2,500-seat capacity.

For 2012–13 season, the club did not enrolled any senior team, keeping its youth teams.

The 2014-15 season was the last one where the club enrolled the teams.

Season to season

12 seasons in Tercera División

Notable former players
 Ismael Urtubi
Mohamed Lachkar (2019)

External links
ffib.es profile 
Futbolme.com profile

Football clubs in the Balearic Islands
Association football clubs established in 1955
Sport in Mallorca
1955 establishments in Spain